This is a list of tennis players who have represented the Colombia Fed Cup team in an official Fed Cup match. Colombia have taken part in the competition since 1972.

Players

References

External links
Federación Colombiana de Tenis

Fed Cup
Lists of Billie Jean King Cup tennis players